Angalifu (pronounced "ang-uh-LEEF-oo"; c. 1970 – December 14, 2014) was a captive northern white rhinoceros held at the San Diego Zoo Safari Park. At the time of his death, he was one of six living northern white rhinoceroses in the world, one of two living males in the world, and the only male on the American continents. He was outlived by male Sudan and females Najin and Fatu. 

Angalifu was born in the wild circa 1970 before being caught and sent to the Khartoum Zoo in Khartoum, Sudan. In 1990, he was transferred on loan to the San Diego Zoo Safari Park, where he lived until his death by natural causes on December 14, 2014, at age 44.

Background
The northern white rhinoceros is one of the two subspecies of the white rhinoceros. Formerly found in several countries in East and Central Africa south of the Sahara, it is considered Critically Endangered. In 2009,  Dvůr Králové Zoo in the Czech Republic sent the four rhinoceroses capable of breeding out of their herd of six to the Ol Pejeta Conservancy in Laikipia County, Kenya, Africa. The move was to induce breeding habits in a more natural habitat for the animals, as mating had not occurred in the Czech Republic. On October 20, 2014, one of the males named Suni died at the Ol Pejeta Conservancy, leaving only six northern white rhinoceros left in the world and only three at the Conservancy. Of the three left at the Conservancy, Sudan was the only male left in the world until his death in Kenya on 19 March 2018, making Angalifu one of only two males in the world when he was alive.

San Diego Zoo Safari Park
At the San Diego Zoo Safari Park, Angalifu roamed freely in a 213 acre habitat that is made to look like the African savanna. He was accompanied by Nola, an elderly female of the same species, who later lived in a different part of the park in the South Africa field habitat and who is now deceased as of November 2015. Angalifu lived in the Central Africa field habitat.  Jane Kennedy was the lead keeper for both Angalifu and Nola.

Breeding attempts
Unsuccessful attempts had been made at breeding Angalifu. Nola, his counterpart at the zoo, was found to be too old to mate. Specialists then obtained sperm from Angalifu to send to the Ol Pejeta Conservancy reserve where four adults were held (two being females), but those attempts at insemination failed. It was suspected that Angalifu was "too old" to reproduce.

Death
Angalifu died from old age on December 14, 2014.

See also
Endling
Extinction
Rare species
Conservation status
Lists of extinct animals

References

1970 animal births
2014 animal deaths
Individual rhinoceroses
San Diego Zoo